The {{nihongo|No.10 minesweeper|第十号掃海艇|Dai Jū Gō Sōkaitei}}, also sometimes called W-10 was a  minesweeper of the Imperial Japanese Navy. It was launched on 21 December 1937 and completed in 1939.

Service record 
The Japanese minesweeper W-10, sometimes also referred to as No. 10,  was a minesweeper of the Imperial Japanese Navy.  It was laid down on 21 December 1937 at Ishikawajima Shipbuilding, (now known as the IHI Corporation) and launched on 22 September 1938. When it was completed on 15 January 1939 it was attached to the Sasebo Naval District.  On 1 June 1941 W-10 was assigned to the Third Fleet, as part of MineSweepDiv 21, along with the minesweepers W-7, W-8, W-9, W-11, and W-12.  

On 27 November of the same year, W-10 departed from Sasebo, and arrived at the Mako Guard District in Formosa, a major base for the Imperial Japanese Navy.  On 7 December 1941, the Japanese invasion of the Philippines began, starting with the invasion of Batan Island, a fairly small island off the north coast of Luzon.  On 10 December, an invasion force was sent to the islands of Vigan and Aparri.  Despite poor weather, the forces still managed to land some troops on the islands.  While participating in the invasion of Vigan, W-10 was attacked by Captain Samuel H. Marrett of the 34th Pursuit Squadron.  Marrett, in a P-35, undertook multiple strafing runs against W-10 until the ship exploded.  The explosion was so powerful that it tore the wing off of Marrett's P-35, causing him to crash into the sea.  Marrett also damaged the Oigawa Maru and Takao Maru.

References 

1938 ships
Mine warfare vessels of the Imperial Japanese Navy
Ships sunk by US aircraft
Minesweepers sunk by aircraft
Maritime incidents in December 1941
Shipwrecks of the Philippines
Ships built by IHI Corporation